The Thirty-eighth Oklahoma Legislature was a meeting of the legislative branch of the government of Oklahoma, composed of the Senate and the House of Representatives. It met in Oklahoma City from January 6 to July 20, 1981, from August 31 to September 4, 1981, and from January 5 to July 12, 1982, during the term of Governor George Nigh. After the legislative council was eliminated in 1980, the Oklahoma House of Representatives added research and fiscal divisions.

Marvin York served as President pro tempore of the Oklahoma Senate and Daniel Draper served as Speaker of the Oklahoma House of Representatives. Frank Keating served as the Minority leader of the Oklahoma Senate. Neal McCaleb served as the Minority leader of the Oklahoma House of Representatives.

Dates of sessions
First regular session: January 6-July 20, 1981
Special session: August 31-September 4, 1981
Second regular session: January 5-July 12, 1982
Previous: 37th Legislature • Next: 39th Legislature

Party composition

Senate

House of Representatives

Leadership

Senate
Oklahoma City Democratic Senator Marvin York served as the President pro tempore of the Oklahoma Senate. Frank Keating served as the Republican Minority leader.

House of Representatives
Democratic Representative Daniel Draper served as the Speaker of the Oklahoma House of Representatives and Mike Murphy served as Speaker Pro Tempore. Representative Neal McCaleb served as the Republican Minority leader of the Oklahoma House of Representatives.

Members

Senate

Tabled based on state almanac.

House of Representatives

Table based on government database.

References

Oklahoma legislative sessions
1981 in Oklahoma
1982 in Oklahoma
1981 U.S. legislative sessions
1982 U.S. legislative sessions